Komanice is a village situated in Mionica municipality in Serbia.

The settlement was recorded as a hamlet and as "Komaniçe" in the Ottoman Tahrir Defter number 94 from 1520. Moreover, in the Tahrir Defter number 151 from 1528 the village had Voynuk households under the Voynugan-ı Istabl-ı Amire military branch, which were Ottoman Christian Soldiers and were tax-exempt.

References

Populated places in Kolubara District